Poyang railway station is a railway station on the Jiujiang–Quzhou railway in Poyang County, Shangrao, Jiangxi, China. It is under the jurisdiction of the Jiujiang section of China Railway Nanchang Group.

History
The station opened with the Jiujiang–Quzhou railway on 28 December 2017.

References

Railway stations in Jiangxi
Railway stations in China opened in 2017